Roncaglia may refer to:

 Roncaglia (surname), a surname of Italian origin

Places
Roncaglia (Piacenza), a frazione of Piacenza, Italy
Roncaglia, a frazione of Casale Monferrato, Italy
Roncaglia, a frazione of Ponte San Nicolò, Italy
Roncaglia, a frazione of San Giovanni Bianco, Italy
Roncaglia, a frazione of Roletto, Italy

Other uses
Diet of Roncaglia, held in 1158 near Piacenza, a general assembly of the nobles and ecclesiasts of the Holy Roman Empire